Golden Greats is the second solo album released by Ian Brown, first made famous by his role as frontman in The Stone Roses. It was described by NME as "a left-field masterpiece and Brown's best work for a decade", Golden Greats showcases a diverse usage of instruments including strings, mellotron and organs. A number of the tracks on the album were written by Brown whilst he was imprisoned for two months following a fracas with a flight attendant.

Track 10, "Babasónicos", is the name of an actual Argentine band that collaborated with Brown on the song.

Track listing
"Gettin' High" (Ian Brown, Aziz Ibrahim) – 4:01
"Love Like a Fountain" (Brown) – 5:14
"Free My Way" (Brown) – 4:19
"Set My Baby Free" (Brown, Aniff Akinola)– 4:26
"So Many Soldiers" (Brown, Dave McCracken, Tim Wills) – 5:16
"Golden Gaze" (Brown, Simon Wolstencroft, Mike Bennett, McCracken, Wills) – 3:56
"Dolphins Were Monkeys" (Brown, McCracken, Wills) – 5:06
"Neptune" (Brown, Sylvan Richardson) – 3:32
"First World" (Brown, Ibrahim) – 5:07
"Babasónicos" (Brown, Diego Tuñon, Walter Kebleris)– 4:05

"Gettin' High" includes an excerpt of "Morrassi" performed by Aziz Ibrahim

2005 US release bonus tracks

Personnel
Ian Brown - vocals, keyboards, drums, arrangements
Aziz Ibrahim - guitar
Tim Wills - electric guitar, piano
Sylvan Richardson - electric guitar, bass guitar, keyboards, cello
Carlos Hernán "Carca" Carcacha - guitar
Dave McCracken - keyboards, programming
Aniff Akinola - keyboards, drums
Simon Wolstencroft - drums
Dan Bierton - drums
Diego Castellano - drums
Inder "Goldfinger" Matharu - percussion
Audrey Riley - cello
Uma-T - harmonica
DJ Peggyn - sound Fx
Technical
Ian Wright - cover portrait

References

1999 albums
Ian Brown albums
Polydor Records albums
Interscope Records albums